Happy Clappers were a house studio project from the UK, featuring Chris Scott, Graeme Ripley, Martin Knotts and Mark Topham, with Sandra Edwards on vocals.

Biography

Happy Clappers scored chart success in the UK and Ireland from 1995 to 1997.

Their highest peak in the UK charts was number seven with "I Believe". Other UK hits included "Hold On", "Can't Help It" and "Never Again".

Their debut album "Games" which includes all their hit singles including the 97 remix of "I Believe" was released in 1997 without chart success.

"I Believe" was never released in the US until American producer Chris Cox remixed it in 2002. It achieved major club success peaking at number-one on the US Club Play charts.

Discography

Studio albums

Singles

See also
List of number-one dance hits (United States)
List of artists who reached number one on the US Dance chart

References

English house music groups
English dance music groups